Pseudanthias hypselosoma is a species of marine ray-finned fish, a member of the genus Pseudanthias which is part of the subfamily Anthiinae, which in turn is part of the family Serranidae, the groupers and sea basses. It is an Indo-Pacific species which is found from the Maldives to Samoa, north to the Ryukyu Islands and south to the Great Barrier Reef. It occasionally makes its way into the aquarium trade. It grows to a size of 19 cm in length.

References

External links
 

hyselosoma
Taxa named by Pieter Bleeker
Fish described in 1878